Karl William Penhale (born 3 February 1992) is an English former first-class cricketer.

Penhale was born at High Wycombe in Buckinghamshire, but was educated at Icknield Community College in neighbouring Oxfordshire. From there he went up to Oxford Brookes University. While studying at Oxford Brookes he made a single appearance in first-class cricket for Oxford MCCU against Nottinghamshire at Oxford in 2014. With his right-arm medium pace bowling, Penhale dismissed Jake Ball and Andy Carter in Nottinghamshire's first-innings, finishing with figures of 2 for 69 from 17.2 overs. In their second-innings he dismissed Luke Fletcher to finish with figures of 1 for 16 from 4.2 overs. Batting twice in the match, Penhale was dismissed for 5 runs in Oxford MCCU's first-innings by Samit Patel, while in their second-innings he was dismissed by Steven Mullaney for 21 runs. In addition to playing first-class cricket, Penhale has also appeared at minor counties level for Oxfordshire between 2013–16, making fourteen appearances in the Minor Counties Championship, alongside thirteen and four appearances in the MCCA Knockout Trophy and Minor Counties Twenty20 respectively.

References

External links

1992 births
Living people
Sportspeople from High Wycombe
Alumni of Oxford Brookes University
English cricketers
Oxford MCCU cricketers
Oxfordshire cricketers